Hashan Vimarshana (born 28 November 1994) is a Sri Lankan first-class cricketer. He was part of Sri Lanka's squad for the 2014 ICC Under-19 Cricket World Cup. He made his List A debut for Sri Lanka Ports Authority Cricket Club in the 2017–18 Premier Limited Overs Tournament on 10 March 2018.

References

External links
 

1994 births
Living people
Sri Lankan cricketers
People from Matara, Sri Lanka
Sri Lanka Ports Authority Cricket Club cricketers